The 2019 Japan Open (officially known as the Daihatsu Yonex Japan Open 2019 for sponsorship reasons) was a BWF World Tour 750 event which took place at Musashino Forest Sport Plaza in Tokyo, Japan, from 23 to 28 July 2019. It had a total purse of $750,000.

Tournament
The 2019 Japan Open was the fifteenth tournament of the 2019 BWF World Tour and also part of the Japan Open championships, which has been held since 1977. This tournament was organized by Nippon Badminton Association with the sanction of the BWF.

Venue
This international tournament was held at Musashino Forest Sport Plaza in Tokyo, Japan.

Point distribution
Below is the point distribution table for each phase of the tournament based on the BWF points system for the BWF World Tour Super 750 event.

Prize money
The total prize money for this tournament was US$750,000. Distribution of prize money was in accordance with BWF regulations.

Men's singles

Seeds

 Kento Momota (champion)
 Shi Yuqi (withdrew)
 Viktor Axelsen (withdrew)
 Chou Tien-chen (second round)
 Chen Long (first round)
 Jonatan Christie (final)
 Anthony Sinisuka Ginting (quarter-finals)
 Srikanth Kidambi (first round)

Finals

Top half

Section 1

Section 2

Bottom half

Section 3

Section 4

Women's singles

Seeds

 Tai Tzu-ying (quarter-finals)
 Chen Yufei (semi-finals)
 Nozomi Okuhara (final)
 Akane Yamaguchi (champion)
 P. V. Sindhu (quarter-finals)
 He Bingjiao (second round)
 Ratchanok Intanon (first round)
 Saina Nehwal (withdrew)

Finals

Top half

Section 1

Section 2

Bottom half

Section 3

Section 4

Men's doubles

Seeds

 Marcus Fernaldi Gideon / Kevin Sanjaya Sukamuljo (champions)
 Takeshi Kamura / Keigo Sonoda (semi-finals)
 Li Junhui / Liu Yuchen (semi-finals)
 Mohammad Ahsan / Hendra Setiawan (final)
 Hiroyuki Endo / Yuta Watanabe (quarter-finals)
 Fajar Alfian / Muhammad Rian Ardianto (second round)
 Han Chengkai / Zhou Haodong (second round)
 Kim Astrup / Anders Skaarup Rasmussen (withdrew)

Finals

Top half

Section 1

Section 2

Bottom half

Section 3

Section 4

Women's doubles

Seeds

 Mayu Matsumoto / Wakana Nagahara (final)
 Yuki Fukushima / Sayaka Hirota (quarter-finals)
 Misaki Matsutomo / Ayaka Takahashi (semi-finals)
 Chen Qingchen / Jia Yifan (second round)
 Greysia Polii / Apriyani Rahayu (quarter-finals)
 Lee So-hee / Shin Seung-chan (second round)
 Shiho Tanaka / Koharu Yonemoto (first round)
 Du Yue / Li Yinhui (quarter-finals)

Finals

Top half

Section 1

Section 2

Bottom half

Section 3

Section 4

Mixed doubles

Seeds

 Zheng Siwei / Huang Yaqiong (quarter-finals)
 Wang Yilyu / Huang Dongping (champions)
 Yuta Watanabe / Arisa Higashino (quarter-finals)
 Dechapol Puavaranukroh / Sapsiree Taerattanachai (quarter-finals)
 Chan Peng Soon / Goh Liu Ying (semi-finals)
 Hafiz Faizal / Gloria Emanuelle Widjaja (semi-finals)
 Praveen Jordan / Melati Daeva Oktavianti (final)
 Tang Chun Man / Tse Ying Suet (first round)

Finals

Top half

Section 1

Section 2

Bottom half

Section 3

Section 4

References

External links
 Tournament Link

Japan Open (badminton)
Japan Open
Japan Open (badminton)
Japan Open (badminton)
Japan Open (badminton)